What's Opera, Doc? is a 1957 American Warner Bros. Merrie Melodies cartoon directed by Chuck Jones and written by Michael Maltese. The short was released on July 6, 1957, and stars Bugs Bunny and Elmer Fudd.

The story features Elmer chasing Bugs through a parody of 19th-century classical composer Richard Wagner's operas, particularly Der Ring des Nibelungen (The Ring of the Nibelung), Der Fliegende Holländer (The Flying Dutchman), and Tannhäuser. It borrows heavily from the second opera in the "Ring Cycle" Die Walküre, woven around the typical Bugs–Elmer feud. The short marks the final appearance of Elmer Fudd in a Chuck Jones cartoon.

It has been widely praised by many in the animation industry as the greatest animated cartoon that Warner Bros. ever released, and has been ranked as such in the top 50 animated cartoons of all time. In 1992, the Library of Congress deemed it "culturally, historically or aesthetically significant", and selected it for preservation in the National Film Registry, the first cartoon short film to receive such honors.

Plot
Dressed as the demigod Siegfried, Elmer Fudd sings "Be vewy qwiet, I'm hunting wabbits" in recitative, before he finds rabbit tracks and arrives at Bugs Bunny's hole. Elmer jams his spear into Bugs' hole while singing "Kill the wabbit! Kill the wabbit! Kill the wabbit!" to the tune of Ride of the Valkyries. Bugs sticks his head out of another rabbit hole and taunts Elmer about his spear and magic helmet. This prompts a display of Elmer-as-Siegfried's "mighty powers", which scares Bugs. Bugs flees and the chase begins.

Elmer stops in his tracks at the sight of the beautiful Valkyrie Brünnhilde (Bugs in drag). "Siegfried" and "Brünnhilde" exchange endearments and perform a short ballet (based on the Venusberg ballet in Tannhäuser). Bugs' true identity is exposed when his headdress falls off, enraging Elmer. Bugs discards his disguise and the chase begins anew. Elmer's rage causes a storm to brew, tearing apart the mountains where Bugs has fled. Upon seeing Bugs' intact yet seemingly lifeless body as a drop of rain from a flower lands on the rabbit, Elmer regrets his wrath and tearfully carries the rabbit off to Valhalla in keeping the Wagnerian theme per Act III of the Valkyries. Bugs (revealed to have merely played dead to fool Elmer) briefly breaks the fourth wall and raises his head to face the audience while remarking, "Well, what did you expect in an opera? A happy ending?" before going back to playing dead.

Voice cast
Mel Blanc as Bugs Bunny (as Brünnhilde), Elmer Fudd (yelling "SMOG!")
Arthur Q. Bryan as Elmer Fudd (as Siegfried) (uncredited)

Production
Originally released to theaters by Warner Bros. on July 6, 1957, What's Opera, Doc? features the speaking and singing voices of Mel Blanc and Arthur Q. Bryan as Bugs and Elmer, respectively. This is the third of the three Warner Bros. shorts (the others being Hare Brush and Rabbit Rampage) in which Elmer defeats Bugs (though here the former shows regret for defeating the latter), as well as the last Elmer Fudd cartoon directed by Jones.

What's Opera, Doc? required about six times as much work and expense as any of the other six-minute cartoons his production unit was turning out at the time. Jones admitted as much, having described a surreptitious re-allocation of production time to complete the short. During the six minutes of What's Opera, Doc?, Jones lampoons Disney's Fantasia, the contemporary style of ballet, Wagner's perceived ponderous operatic style, and even the by-then clichéd Bugs-and-Elmer formula.

Michael Maltese devised the story for the cartoon, and also wrote lyrics to Wagner's music to create the duet "Return My Love". Art director Maurice Noble devised the stylized backdrops. The cartoon drew upon previous Warner studio work: Maltese originated the concept of Bugs in Valkyrie drag riding a fat horse to the Tannhäuser Pilgrim's Chorus in the suppressed 1945 wartime cartoon Herr Meets Hare, directed by Friz Freleng.

The legacy of "Kill the Wabbit"
What's Opera, Doc?  is sometimes alluded to informally in conversations and in online and printed references as "Kill the Wabbit". This unofficial, alternative title is derived from the line sung by Elmer to the tune of Wagner's "Ride of the Valkyries", part of the opening passage from Act Three of Die Walküre, which is also the leitmotif of the Valkyries. For his 2016 article about the cartoon, one titled "How Bugs Bunny and 'Kill the Wabbit' Inspired a Generation of Opera Stars", Michael Phillips of The Wall Street Journal examined how "a cartoon rabbit and his speech-impaired nemesis" provided many children in 1957 and in the decades thereafter their first, albeit absurd exposure to Wagner's compositions and to the world of opera. 

Phillips in his article furnishes comments by various operatic performers and stage crews regarding how watching What's Opera, Doc? affected them personally as children and in some cases contributed to the early development of their theatrical careers. Mezzo-soprano Elizabeth Bishopa native of Greenville, South Carolina and a featured performer at the Washington National Opera, the San Francisco Opera, and the Metropolitan Operastated to Phillips, "'I could sing you the entire cartoon before I knew what opera really was'", adding "'Those of us who didn't freak at the sight of a rabbit in a winged helmet sliding off of the back of a fat horsewe went into opera.'" Jamie Barton, another notable American mezzo-soprano, also shared with Phillips her reactions to seeing the short for the first time in the mid-1990s, when she was a middle-schooler growing up in Athens, Georgia. As she prepared in 2016 for her performance as Waltraute in Wagner's Götterdämmerung at the Kennedy Center in Washington, D.C., Barton reflected on What's Opera, Doc? and credited it and Warner Bros.' earlier burlesque short Rabbit of Seville with initially drawing her attention to opera and instilling in her a "love" for classical works, especially the music of Italian composer Gioachino Rossini. "'I had never'", she remarked to Phillips, "'been exposed to opera music before Bugs Bunny'". 

Michael Heaston, a former pianist for the Dallas Opera and in 2016 an adviser to the director of the Washington National Opera, also described to Phillips his memories of seeing What's Opera, Doc? and other Warner Bros. cartoons as a small child in West Des Moines, Iowa. For Heaston those shorts served as catalysts that ultimately led him to establishing a career in opera. "'At a very base level'", he noted, "'that's what I got from Looney Tunes at a very early age: I learned how to tell stories through music.'"

The 50th anniversary of "'Kill da wabbit'", 2007
The enduring audience appeal of What's Opera Doc? extends beyond stage professionals and the borders of the United States. In Canada in 2007, the Toronto Star newspaper featured in its July 8 issue an article by Steve Watt titled "50 glorious years of 'kill da wabbit'". Watt, a cartoon historian and owner of an animation art gallery in Toronto, discusses in his article the golden anniversary that two days earlier had marked the initial release of the short, and he assesses its continuing popularity. "No one", he writes, "who knows and loves 'What's Opera, Doc?' will ever hear Wagner's 'Der Ring des Nibelungen' without hearing, in their own minds, 'Kill da wabbit...kill da wabbit.'" Watt continues, "While classical music aficionados may be offended by that fact, I'm okay with it. More than okay with it." He then describes a past event he had organized and held at a Toronto movie theater, where he presented a selection of Chuck Jones' cartoons. He also describes the audience's reaction to seeing the shorts on the "big screen", including What's Opera, Doc?:
Such reactions to "the Wagnerian mini epic" a half century after its release once again attest to the cartoon's unique composition and appeal, qualities that were even recognized as "special" in 1957 by some film-industry publications. For example, the Philadelphia-based journal Motion Picture Exhibitor, which in 1957 had a readership composed largely of theater owners and managers, reviewed the short in August that year and rated it "excellent". The Exhibitor then prophetically observed, "This is far above the usual run of animated cartoons and should find special favor in art houses, believe it or not."

Addition to National Film Registry and the short's historical rankings
In 1992, the United States Library of Congress deemed What's Opera, Doc? "'culturally, historically, or aesthetically significant'" and selected it for induction to the National Film Registry, making it the first short cartoon to receive that honor. Two more Warner Bros. cartoons were later inducted into the registry: Duck Amuck in 1999 and One Froggy Evening in 2003. Their inclusion made Chuck Jones the only animator with three shorts thus recognized.

What's Opera, Doc? in 1994 ranked number one on a list of The 50 Greatest Cartoons of all time. The list, compiled by animation historian Jerry Beck, was the result of surveying and evaluating the opinions of 1,000 professional animators.

In 2023, the short has an 8.3 positive rating on the online database IMDb, tying it with Rabbit of Seville (1950) as the third highest-rated releases among the large number of Warner Bros. cartoons profiled on that platform. The studio's productions Duck Amuck (1953) and One Froggy Evening (1955) rank number one and two respectively on IMDb.

Home media
 DVD: The Bugs Bunny/Road Runner Movie
 DVD: Looney Tunes Golden Collection: Volume 2
 DVD: The Essential Bugs Bunny
 Blu-ray: Looney Tunes Platinum Collection: Volume 1
Blu-ray: Bugs Bunny 80th Anniversary Collection
 iTunes: Bugs Bunny, Vol. 1 (paired with Bugs Bunny Gets the Boid)
 Xbox Live Marketplace: October 23, 2007

See also
 List of American films of 1957
 The 50 Greatest Cartoons
 Rabbit of Seville

References

Bibliography
 Beck, Jerry and Friedwald, Will (1989). Looney Tunes and Merrie Melodies: A Complete Illustrated Guide to the Warner Bros. Cartoons. Henry Holt and Company.
 Freedman, Richard. What's Opera, Doc?, Andante Magazine, March 2002.
 Goldmark, Daniel (2005). "What's Opera, Doc? and Cartoon Opera", in Tunes for 'Toons: Music and the Hollywood Cartoon, University of California Press.
 Thomas, Todd and Barbara. WHAT'S OPERA, DOC? – An analysis of the various Richard Wagner operas used throughout the cartoon.

External links
What’s Opera, Doc? essay  by Craig Kausen at National Film Registry
What’s Opera, Doc? essay by Daniel Eagan in America's Film Legacy: The Authoritative Guide to the Landmark Movies in the National Film Registry, A&C Black, 2010 , pages 532-533 

 
 Andante Magazine article on What's Opera, Doc? and Rabbit of Seville
 Intimate Enemies: What's Opera, Doc? followed by Bugs Loves Elmer Redux analyze the cartoon at New Savanna blog.

1957 films
1957 animated films
1957 short films
1950s musical comedy-drama films
1950s parody films
American musical comedy-drama films
Cross-dressing in American films
Short films directed by Chuck Jones
Merrie Melodies short films
Films based on operas
United States National Film Registry films
Films based on works by Richard Wagner
Bugs Bunny films
Elmer Fudd films
1957 comedy films
1950s Warner Bros. animated short films
Films scored by Milt Franklyn
Films with screenplays by Michael Maltese
Films produced by Edward Selzer
1950s English-language films
Films based on the Nibelungenlied